Round Lake is a lake located in Killaloe, Hagarty and Richards Township, Renfrew County, Ontario, Canada. The Bonnechere River flows into the lake in the northwest and flows out of the lake at the southeast.

There are two provincial parks on the lake, Bonnechere Provincial Park on the northwestern shore and Foy Provincial Park on the eastern shore.

The edge of the lake before the rise in water level was about 75 yards out from our present shore.

Round Lake is the first major lake in the course of the Bonnechere River which begins at Mckaskill Lake in Algonquin Park to the north, and passes through Golden Lake, Eganville, Douglas and Renfrew before emptying into the Ottawa River near Castleford.

References

Lakes of Renfrew County